Jatz is a brand of malted Australian cracker introduced by Arnott's Biscuits in 1952. The crackers are circular, about 5cm in diameter, lightly salted on one side and have a scalloped edge. It is typically eaten with cheese, dips, cabanossi, Vegemite or by itself. It is available in original, cracked pepper, fat free and Clix varieties.

Savoy 

Savoy is an extremely similar cracker initially introduced by the Brockhoff Biscuits in 1938. While they were originally competitors, with the merger of Brockhoff and Arnott's in 1963 the decision was made to keep both products on store shelves. Today the only difference between the two biscuits (besides branding) is the replacement of the full cream milk powder and malt in Jatz with golden syrup in Savoy.

References

Australian snack foods
Australian brands
Brand name crackers